Tayyib-Ism is a small town in north-western Saudi Arabia in the province of Tabuk. It is located in the upland area (314 m), approx. 10km east of the eastern coast of the Gulf of Aqaba, Red Sea, at 28° 34' 0"n, 34° 50' 0"e.  To the west of the village there are unspoiled coral reefs. 
The site is considered important to some in the Latter Day Saint movement.

References

Populated coastal places in Saudi Arabia
Populated places in Tabuk Province
Underwater diving sites in Saudi Arabia
Red Sea